The Mud, Water, Air & Blood is the fourth and final studio album by Dark Lotus. The album was released on July 29, 2014.

Background
In a February 2014 interview with Faygoluvers.net Insane Clown Posse announced that they were getting ready to hit the studio and record a Dark Lotus album in 2014. On March 12, 2014, Insane Clown Posse, Twiztid and Blaze Ya Dead Homie's media outlets a picture was posted by each one with the DL sign and roman numerals translating to (7/29/2014). It was later revealed that the album will be released on July 29, 2014, but will initially be released at the 2014 GOTJ.

Track listing

Personnel
Insane Clown Posse - vocals, lyrics
Twiztid - vocals, lyrics
Blaze Ya Dead Homie - vocals, lyrics
Anybody Killa - guest verse on "Villainous"
Kuma - producer (1, 2, 6, 7, 10, 11, 16)
Legz Diamond - Additional vocals on "Let it rain"
Michelle Bruce - Additional vocals on "Let it rain"
Seven - producer (3, 4, 8, 12, 15)
Fritz The Cat - producer (9, 13)
Young Wicked (Otis) - producer (5, 14)

Charts

References

2014 albums
Dark Lotus albums
Psychopathic Records albums